This is a list of Category A listed buildings in Argyll and Bute, Scotland.

In Scotland, the term listed building refers to a building or other structure officially designated as being of "special architectural or historic interest". Category A structures are those considered to be "buildings of national or international importance, either architectural or historic, or fine little-altered examples of some particular period, style or building type." Listing was begun by a provision in the Town and Country Planning (Scotland) Act 1947, and the current legislative basis for listing is the Planning (Listed Buildings and Conservation Areas) (Scotland) Act 1997. The authority for listing rests with Historic Environment Scotland, an executive agency of the Scottish Government, which inherited this role from the Scottish Development Department in 1991. Once listed, severe restrictions are imposed on the modifications allowed to a building's structure or its fittings. Listed building consent must be obtained from local authorities prior to any alteration to such a structure. There are 2,031 listed buildings in the area, of which approximately 150 are Category A.

Listed buildings 

|}

See also
 Scheduled monuments in Argyll and Bute

Notes

References

External links

Argyll and Bute